Robert Mose (fl. 1421–1427), of Dorchester, Dorset, was an English politician.

Family
He married a woman named Joan, and they are thought to have had one son.

Career
He was a Member (MP) of the Parliament of England for Dorchester in December 1421 and 1427.

References

Year of birth missing
Year of death missing
English MPs December 1421
Members of the Parliament of England for Dorchester
English MPs 1427